Sarah Dunn may refer to:

 Sarah Dunn (author) (born 1975), American writer
 Sarah Jayne Dunn (born 1981), British actress